Keenaght is a townland lying within the civil parish of Kilcronaghan, County Londonderry, Northern Ireland. It lies in the south of the parish on the boundary with the civil parish of Desertmartin, and it is bounded by the townlands of: Coolsaragh, Cullion, Gortahurk, Longfield, and Tintagh. It was apportioned to the Drapers company.

The townland was part of Tobermore electoral ward of the former Magherafelt District Council, however in 1901 and 1926 it was part of Iniscarn district electoral division as part of the Draperstown dispensary (registrar's) district of Magherafelt Rural District. As part of Kilcronaghan civil parish, Keenaght also lies in the historic barony of Loughinsholin.

Etymology
The present name of this townland, Keenaght, is very likely a reformed analogy of the neighbouring barony of Keenaght, with scribal errors adding a t to the end of anglicisations of its name such as with Tonaght in the neighbouring parish of Ballynascreen, which actually derives from Tonach. It is more reasonably suggested that Keenaght derives from the synonym Coanna with the adjectival suffix -ach added to it. This derivation is supported by the majority of earlier recorded forms.

History

See also
Kilcronaghan
List of townlands in Tobermore
Tobermore

References

Townlands of County Londonderry
Civil parish of Kilcronaghan